Gilbert Rist (16 July 1938 – 15 February 2023) was a Swiss educator who was honorary professor at the Graduate Institute of International and Development Studies in Geneva. He was best known for his study, The History of Development: From Western Origins to Global Faith, which criticizes development. Rist held a PhD from the Graduate Institute of International Studies.

Rist died on 15 February 2023, at the age of 84.

Writings
English
Gilbert Rist, The History of Development: From Western Origins to Global Faith, Expanded Edition, London: Zed Books, 2003
Gilbert Rist, The Delusions of Economics: The Misguided Certainties of a Hazardous Science, London: Zed Books, 2011

French (selection)
(with Marie-Dominique PERROT and Fabrizio SABELLI), La mythologie programmée, L’économie des croyances dans la société moderne, coll. Economie en liberté, PUF, Paris, 1992
(with Majid Rahnema and Gustavo Esteva), Le Nord perdu, Repères pour l’après-développement, coll. Forum du développement, Editions d’En Bas, Lausanne, 1992
Le développement, Histoire d'une croyance occidentale, Presses de Sciences Po, Paris, 1996 - also translated into Italian and Spanish
L'économie ordinaire entre songes et mensonges, Presses de Sciences Po, Paris, 2010

References

External links

See also
Development criticism

1938 births
2023 deaths
Swiss educators
Graduate Institute of International and Development Studies alumni
Academic staff of the Graduate Institute of International and Development Studies
People from Geneva